Barbie and the Sensations: Rockin' Back to Earth is a 1987 American animated television special and the sequel to Barbie and the Rockers: Out of This World. Both films were released together by Hi-Tops Video.

Plot
Following their concert for world peace in outer space, Barbie and her band the Rockers are going back home. During the trip back to Earth, the band's space shuttle inadvertently enters a time warp. Upon landing at an airport, they meet Dr. Merrishaw and his daughter Kim and soon learn that they have been transported back to 1959. The band then decides to go on a tour around the city alongside Kim, performing at several spots. After a performance at Cape Canaveral, Dr. Merrishaw helps Barbie and the Rockers return to their time. Back in the present, they stage a big concert in New York City, where Barbie is reunited with an adult Kim and introduced to her daughter Megan.

Songs Sing Alongs
 "Rockin Back"
 "Dressin Up"
 "Rockin Back Reprise" 
 "Blue Jean Boy"
 "Disco Dolly & Blockbuster Video Commercial Blockbuster Kids Finale"
 Ending titles: "Long Credits End Credits"

References

External links
 
 
 Barbie and the Sensations: Rockin' Back to Earth review by Entertainment Weekly

1980s American animated films
1980s American television specials
1980s musical films
1980s science fiction adventure films
1980s animated television specials
1987 television specials
American children's animated space adventure films
American children's animated musical films
American children's animated science fiction films
American rock music films
American sequel films
Sensations: Rockin' Back to Earth
DIC Entertainment films
English-language television shows
Films about musical groups
Films set in 1959
Films set in 1987
Films set in the United States
Musical television specials
Science fiction musical films
Science fiction television specials
Television sequel films
Animated films about time travel
Saban Entertainment films
1987 films
Films scored by Shuki Levy
Films scored by Haim Saban
Films directed by Bernard Deyriès
1980s French films